The Declaration of the Rights of Man and of the Citizen, set by France's National Constituent Assembly in 1789, is a human civil rights document from the French Revolution. Inspired by Enlightenment philosophers, the Declaration was a core statement of the values of the French Revolution and had a significant impact on the development of popular conceptions of individual liberty and democracy in Europe and worldwide.

The Declaration was initially drafted by the Marquis de Lafayette, but the majority of the final draft came from the Abbé Sieyès. Influenced by the doctrine of natural right, human rights are held to be universal: valid at all times and in every place. It became the basis for a nation of free individuals protected equally by the law. It is included at the beginning of the constitutions of both the Fourth French Republic (1946) and Fifth Republic (1958), and is considered valid as constitutional law.

History
The content of the document emerged largely from the ideals of the Enlightenment.
Lafayette prepared the principal drafts in consultation with his close friend Thomas Jefferson. In August 1789, the Abbé Emmanuel Joseph Sieyès and Honoré Mirabeau played a central role in conceptualizing and drafting the final Declaration of the Rights of Man and of the Citizen.

The last article of the Declaration of the Rights of Man and the Citizen was adopted on the 26 of August 1789 by the National Constituent Assembly, during the period of the French Revolution, as the first step toward writing a constitution for France. The draft was later modified during the debates. A second and lengthier declaration, known as the Declaration of the Rights of Man and Citizen of 1793, was written in 1793 but never formally adopted.

Philosophical and theoretical context

The concepts in the Declaration come from the philosophical and political duties of the Enlightenment, such as individualism, the social contract as theorized by the Genevan philosopher Rousseau, and the separation of powers espoused by the Baron de Montesquieu. As can be seen in the texts, the French declaration was heavily influenced by the political philosophy of the Enlightenment and principles of human rights, as was the U.S. Declaration of Independence, which preceded it (4 July 1776).

The declaration defines a single set of individual and collective rights for all men. Influenced by the doctrine of natural rights, these rights are held to be universal and valid in all times and places. For example, "Men are born and remain free and equal in rights. Social distinctions may be founded only upon the general good." They have certain natural rights to property, to liberty, and to life. According to this theory, the role of government is to recognize and secure these rights. Furthermore, the government should be carried on by elected representatives.

When it was written, the rights contained in the declaration were only awarded to men. Furthermore, the declaration was a statement of vision rather than reality. The declaration was not deeply rooted in either the practice of the West or even France at the time. The declaration emerged in the late 18th century out of war and revolution. It encountered opposition, as democracy and individual rights were frequently regarded as synonymous with anarchy and subversion. This declaration embodies ideals and aspirations towards which France pledged to struggle in the future.

Substance

The Declaration is introduced by a preamble describing the fundamental characteristics of the rights, which are qualified as "natural, unalienable and sacred" and "simple and incontestable principles" on which citizens could base their demands. In the second article, "the natural and imprescriptible rights of man" are defined as "liberty, property, security and resistance to oppression". It called for the destruction of aristocratic privileges by proclaiming an end to feudalism and to exemptions from taxation, freedom, and equal rights for all "Men" and access to public office based on talent. The monarchy was restricted, and all citizens had the right to participate in the legislative process. Freedom of speech and press were declared, and arbitrary arrests outlawed.

The Declaration also asserted the principles of popular sovereignty, in contrast to the divine right of kings that characterized the French monarchy, and social equality among citizens, "All the citizens, being equal in the eyes of the law, are equally admissible to all public dignities, places, and employments, according to their capacity and without distinction other than that of their virtues and of their talents," eliminating the special rights of the nobility and clergy.

Articles
Article I – Men are born and remain free and equal in rights. Social distinctions may be founded only upon the general good.

Article II – The goal of any political association is the conservation of the natural and imprescriptible rights of man. These rights are liberty, property, safety and resistance against oppression.

Article III – The principle of any sovereignty resides essentially in the Nation. No body, no individual may exercise any authority which does not proceed directly from the nation.

Article IV – Liberty consists of doing anything which does not harm others: thus, the exercise of the natural rights of each man has only those borders which assure other members of the society the fruition of these same rights. These borders can be determined only by the law.

Article V – The law has the right to forbid only actions harmful to society. Anything which is not forbidden by the law cannot be impeded, and no one can be constrained to do what it does not order.

Article VI – The law is the expression of the general will. All the citizens have the right of contributing personally or through their representatives to its formation. It must be the same for all, either that it protects, or that it punishes. All the citizens, being equal in its eyes, are equally admissible to all public dignities, places, and employments, according to their capacity and without distinction other than that of their virtues and of their talents.

Article VII – No man can be accused, arrested nor detained but in the cases determined by the law, and according to the forms which it has prescribed. Those who solicit, dispatch, carry out or cause to be carried out arbitrary orders, must be punished; but any citizen called or seized under the terms of the law must obey at once; he renders himself culpable by resistance.

Article VIII – The law should establish only penalties that are strictly and evidently necessary, and no one can be punished but under a law established and promulgated before the offense and legally applied.

Article IX – Any man being presumed innocent until he is declared culpable if it is judged indispensable to arrest him, any rigor which would not be necessary for the securing of his person must be severely reprimanded by the law.

Article X – No one may be disquieted for his opinions, even religious ones, provided that their manifestation does not trouble the public order established by the law.

Article XI – The free communication of thoughts and of opinions is one of the most precious rights of man: any citizen thus may speak, write, print freely, except to respond to the abuse of this liberty, in the cases determined by the law.

Article XII – The guarantee of the rights of man and of the citizen necessitates a public force: this force is thus instituted for the advantage of all and not for the particular utility of those in whom it is trusted.

Article XIII – For the maintenance of the public force and for the expenditures of administration, a common contribution is indispensable; it must be equally distributed to all the citizens, according to their ability to pay.

Article XIV – Each citizen has the right to ascertain, by himself or through his representatives, the need for a public tax, to consent to it freely, to know the uses to which it is put, and of determining the proportion, basis, collection, and duration.

Article XV – The society has the right of requesting an account from any public agent of its administration.

Article XVI – Any society in which the guarantee of rights is not assured, nor the separation of powers determined, has no Constitution.

Article XVII – Property being an inviolable and sacred right, no one can be deprived of private usage, if it is not when the public necessity, legally noted, evidently requires it, and under the condition of a just and prior indemnity.

Active and passive citizenship
While the French Revolution provided rights to a larger portion of the population, there remained a distinction between those who obtained the political rights in the Declaration of the Rights of Man and of the Citizen and those who did not. Those who were deemed to hold these political rights were called active citizens. Active citizenship was granted to men who were French, at least 25 years old, paid taxes equal to three days work, and could not be defined as servants. This meant that at the time of the Declaration, only male property owners held these rights.  The deputies in the National Assembly believed that only those who held tangible interests in the nation could make informed political decisions. This distinction directly affects articles 6, 12, 14, and 15 of the Declaration of the Rights of Man and of the Citizen, as each of these rights is related to the right to vote and to participate actively in the government. With the decree of 29 October 1789, the term active citizen became embedded in French politics.

The concept of passive citizens was created to encompass those populations excluded from political rights in the Declaration of the Rights of Man and of the Citizen. Because of the requirements set down for active citizens, the vote was granted to approximately 4.3 million Frenchmen out of a population of around 29 million. These omitted groups included women, enslaved people, children, and foreigners. As the General Assembly voted upon these measures, they limited the rights of certain groups of citizens while implementing the democratic process of the new French Republic (1792–1804). This legislation, passed in 1789, was amended by the creators of the Constitution of the Year III to eliminate the label of an active citizen. The power to vote was then, however, to be granted solely to substantial property owners.

Tensions arose between active and passive citizens throughout the Revolution. This happened when passive citizens started to call for more rights or openly refused to listen to the ideals set forth by active citizens. This cartoon demonstrates the difference that existed between the active and passive citizens along with the tensions associated with such differences. In the cartoon, an active citizen is holding a spade and a passive citizen (on the right) says "Take care that my patience does not escape me".

Women, in particular, were strong passive citizens who played a significant role in the Revolution. Olympe de Gouges penned her Declaration of the Rights of Woman and of the Female Citizen in 1791 and drew attention to the need for gender equality. By supporting the ideals of the French Revolution and wishing to expand them to women, she represented herself as a revolutionary citizen. Madame Roland also established herself as an influential figure throughout the Revolution. She saw women of the French Revolution as holding three roles; "inciting revolutionary action, formulating policy, and informing others of revolutionary events." By working with men, as opposed to working apart from men, she may have been able to further the fight for revolutionary women. As players in the French Revolution, women occupied a significant role in the civic sphere by forming social movements and participating in popular clubs, allowing them societal influence, despite their lack of direct political power.

Women's rights
The Declaration recognized many rights as belonging to citizens (who could only be male). This was despite the fact that after The March on Versailles on 5 October 1789, women presented the Women's Petition to the National Assembly in which they proposed a decree giving women equal rights. In 1790, Nicolas de Condorcet and Etta Palm d'Aelders unsuccessfully called on the National Assembly to extend civil and political rights to women. Condorcet declared that "he who votes against the right of another, whatever the religion, color, or sex of that other, has henceforth abjured his own". The French Revolution did not lead to a recognition of women's rights and this prompted Olympe de Gouges to publish the Declaration of the Rights of Woman and of the Female Citizen in September 1791.

The Declaration of the Rights of Woman and of the Female Citizen is modeled on the Declaration of the Rights of Man and of the Citizen and is ironic in the formulation and exposes the failure of the French Revolution, which had been devoted to equality. It states that:

This revolution will only take effect when all women become fully aware of their deplorable condition, and of the rights, they have lost in society.

The Declaration of the Rights of Woman and of the Female Citizen follows the seventeen articles of the Declaration of the Rights of Man and of the Citizen point for point. Camille Naish has described it as "almost a parody... of the original document". The first article of the Declaration of the Rights of Man and of the Citizen proclaims that "Men are born and remain free and equal in rights. Social distinctions may be based only on common utility." The first article of the Declaration of the Rights of Woman and the Female Citizen replied: "Woman is born free and remains equal to man in rights. Social distinctions may only be based on common utility".

De Gouges also draws attention to the fact that under French law, women were fully punishable yet denied equal rights, declaring, "Women have the right to mount the scaffold, they must also have the right to mount the speaker's rostrum".

Slavery
The declaration did not revoke the institution of slavery, as lobbied for by Jacques-Pierre Brissot's Les Amis des Noirs and defended by the group of colonial planters called the Club Massiac because they met at the Hôtel Massiac. Despite the lack of explicit mention of slavery in the Declaration, slave uprisings in Saint-Domingue in the Haitian Revolution were inspired by it, as discussed in C. L. R. James' history of the Haitian Revolution, The Black Jacobins. In Louisiana, the organizers of the Pointe Coupée Slave Conspiracy of 1795 also drew information from the declaration.

Deplorable conditions for the thousands of enslaved people in Saint-Domingue, the most profitable slave colony in the world, led to the uprisings known as the first successful slave revolt in the New World. Free persons of color were part of the first wave of revolt, but later formerly enslaved people took control. In 1794 the Convention was dominated by the Jacobins abolished slavery, including in the colonies of Saint-Domingue and Guadeloupe. However, Napoleon reinstated it in 1802 and attempted to regain control of Saint-Domingue by sending in thousands of troops. After suffering the losses of two-thirds of the men, many to yellow fever, the French withdrew from Saint-Domingue in 1803. Napoleon gave up on North America and agreed to the Louisiana Purchase by the United States. In 1804, the leaders of Saint-Domingue declared it an independent state, the Republic of Haiti, the second republic of the New World. Napoleon abolished the slave trade in 1815. Slavery in France was finally abolished in 1848.

Homosexuality
The vast amount of personal freedom given to citizens by the document created a situation where homosexuality was decriminalized by the French Penal Code of 1791, which covered felonies; the law simply failed to mention sodomy as a crime, and thus no one could be prosecuted for it. The 1791 Code of Municipal Police did provide misdemeanor penalties for "gross public indecency," which the police could use to punish anyone having sex in public places or otherwise violating social norms. This approach to punishing homosexual conduct was reiterated in the French Penal Code of 1810.

See also
 Bill of rights
 Human rights in France
 Rights of Man
 Universality

Other early declarations of rights
 The decreta of León 
 Magna Carta 
 Statute of Kalisz 
 Henrician Articles and Pacta conventa 
 Petition of Right 
 Bill of Rights 
 Claim of Right 
 Virginia Declaration of Rights 
 Pennsylvania Declaration of Rights 
 Bill of Rights 
 Declaration of the Rights of Man and Citizen of Franchimont 
 "Belgian" Declaration of the Rights of Man and Citizen 
  
 "Batavian" Declaration of the Rights of Man and Citizen

Citations

General references 
 Jack Censer and Lynn Hunt, Liberty, Equality, Fraternity: Exploring the French Revolution, University Park: Pennsylvania State University Press, 2001.
 Susan Dalton, "Gender and the Shifting Ground of Revolutionary Politics: The Case of Madame Roland", Canadian Journal of History, 36, no. 2 (2001): 259–83. . .
 William Doyle, The Oxford History of the French Revolution, Oxford: Oxford University Press, 1989.
 Darline Levy and Harriet Applewhite, A Political Revolution for Women? The Case of Paris, in The French Revolution: Conflicting Interpretations. 5th ed. Malabar, Fla.: Krieger Pub. Co., 2002. 317–46.
 Jeremy Popkin, A History of Modern France, Upper Saddle River: Pearson Education, 2006.
 "Active Citizen/Passive Citizen", Liberty, Equality, Fraternity: Exploring the French Revolution (accessed 30 October 2011). Project History.

Further reading
 Gérard Conac, Marc Debene, Gérard Teboul, eds, La Déclaration des droits de l'homme et du citoyen de 1789; histoire, analyse et commentaires , Economica, Paris, 1993, .
 McLean, Iain. "Thomas Jefferson, John Adams, and the Déclaration des Droits de l'Homme et du Citoyen" in The Future of Liberal Democracy: Thomas Jefferson and the Contemporary World (Palgrave Macmillan, 2004)

External links
 
 

1789 documents
1789 events of the French Revolution
1789 in law
18th century in Paris
Age of Enlightenment
Gilbert du Motier, Marquis de Lafayette
Government of France
History of human rights
Human rights in France
Human rights instruments
Memory of the World Register
Political charters
Popular sovereignty
Works by Thomas Jefferson